The 1988 McNeese State Cowboys football team was an American football team that represented McNeese State University as a member of the Southland Conference (Southland) during the 1988 NCAA Division I-AA football season. In their second year under head coach Sonny Jackson, the team compiled an overall record of 6–5, with a mark of 3–3 in conference play, and finished fourth in the Southland.

Schedule

References

McNeese State
McNeese Cowboys football seasons
McNeese State Cowboys football